Rodrigo Ideus (born 7 March 1987) is a Colombian rower. He competed in the men's single sculls event at the 2008 Summer Olympics.

References

External links
 

1987 births
Living people
Colombian male rowers
Olympic rowers of Colombia
Rowers at the 2008 Summer Olympics
Sportspeople from Reading, Berkshire
20th-century Colombian people
21st-century Colombian people